State Road 693 (SR 693) is a  north–south street serving southern Pinellas County, Florida. Locally known as 66th Street, Pasadena Avenue, and A19A, the southern terminus is an intersection with Blind Pass Road and Gulf Way (SR 699) in St. Pete Beach, near the southern end of the Corey Causeway; the northern terminus is an intersection with U.S. Route 19 (US 19 and SR 55) within the Largo city limits (US 19-SR 55 continues northward on 66th Street).

In addition to the cities at the termini, SR 693 passes through (from south to north) South Pasadena, St. Petersburg, Kenneth City, and Pinellas Park.

While the A19A designation is better known, 66th Street had the SR 693 signage long before the opening of the Pinellas Bayway on December 21, 1962: on this date the loop of SR 693, SR 699, and the Bayway between Alternate US 19 (SR 595) and US 19 near the Sunshine Skyway received A19A signage to be placed beside or above their older state road designations. In the 1980s, the A19A signs were removed from the loop (the east–west Pinellas Bayway then had its initial A19A signs replaced with State Road 682 signage by successor Florida Department of Transportation).

State Road 693 is a major commercial and commuter highway that, via the Corey Causeway and the nearby Treasure Island Causeway, connects the highly popular barrier islands along the Gulf of Mexico.  The northern end of SR 693 features the campuses of Florida Beacon College and Florida Beacon Bible College; the segment in Pinellas Park features commercial campgrounds, a frequent sight along cross street SR 688 just north of the city.

Major intersections

References

External links

693
693